Calliostoma gavaldoni is a species of sea snail, a marine gastropod mollusk in the family Calliostomatidae.

Description

Distribution
This species occurs in the Pacific Ocean off Tahiti.

References

 Vilvens C. (2009). A new species of Calliostoma (Gastropoda: Trochoidea: Calliostomatidae) from Tahiti. Novapex 10(3): 109-113

External links

gavaldoni
Gastropods described in 2009